Raphaël Jerusalmy (born 7 November 1954, in Paris) is a French writer.

Biography 
Raphaël Jerusalmy is graduated from the École normale supérieure. After his studies, he joined the Israeli army, where he rapidly evolved into Intelligence Service. After fifteen years, he retired from the army and carried out educational and humanitarian actions, then became an old books dealer in Tel Aviv. He is also an "expert" on the TV channel I24news.

Works 
2002: Shalom Tsahal. Confessions d’un lieutenant-colonel des renseignements israéliens, Paris, NM 7 éditeur, 394 p. .
2012: Sauver Mozart. Le Journal d'Otto J. Steiner, Arles, Actes Sud, series "Domaine français", 148 p. 
 - Prix Emmanuel Roblès 2013.
 - Prix littéraire de l'ENS Cachan.
2013: La Confrérie des chasseurs de livres, Actes Sud, series "Domaine français", 320 p. .
2016: Les obus jouaient à pigeon vole, Éditions , 177 p. .
2017: Évacuation, Arles, Actes Sud, 128 p. .
2018: La Rose de Saragosse, Arles, France, Actes Sud, 192 p. 
 2022: In Absentia, Actes Sud, 176 p.

References

External links 
 Raphaël Jerusalmy on Babelio
 Raphaël Jerusalmy on Ricochet-Jeunes
 L'intrigue sombre et musicale de Raphaël Jerusalmy on L'Express (25 May 2012)
 Raphaël Jérusalmy, Dialogues littéraires on YouTube

21st-century French novelists
Prix Emmanuel Roblès recipients
École Normale Supérieure alumni
Writers from Paris
1954 births
Living people